Suranarai railway station is a railway station located in Muang Khom Subdistrict, Chai Badan District, Lopburi Province. It opened in 1956 as part of the Northeastern Line Kaeng Khoi Junction–Suranarai section.

References 

Railway stations in Thailand
Lopburi province